Athletics Vanuatu, also known as Vanuatu Athletics Association, is the governing body for the sport of athletics in Vanuatu.  Current president is former sprinter Jansen Molisingi.  He was elected for the first time in February 2012.

History 
Athletics Vanuatu was founded in 1965 as New Hebrides Amateur Athletic Association by Rev. William Donald Francis, Alan Bell, and a few others, and was affiliated to the IAAF in the year 1966.

Affiliations 
International Association of Athletics Federations (IAAF)
Oceania Athletics Association (OAA)
Moreover, it is part of the following national organisations:
Vanuatu Association of Sports and National Olympic Committee (VASANOC)

National records 
Athletics Vanuatu maintains the Vanuatuan records in athletics.

References 

Vanuatu
Sport in Vanuatu
Athletics in Vanuatu
National governing bodies for athletics
Sports organizations established in 1965
1965 establishments in Oceania